Sir John Evelyn Gladstone, 4th Baronet  (23 November 1855 – 12 February 1945) was the 4th Baronet of Fasque and Balfour. He succeeded to the title on 25 June 1926 on the death of his cousin, Sir John Robert Gladstone, the 3rd Baronet.

He was the son of John Neilson Gladstone, an older brother of William Ewart Gladstone, who later became Prime Minister, and Elizabeth Honoria Bateson. He attended William Gladstone's state funeral in 1898. Gladstone was educated at Eton College and Christ Church, Oxford. He was an officer in the Royal Wiltshire Yeomanry Cavalry. He married Gertrude Theresa Miller, the daughter of Sir Charles Hayes Miller, on 3 January 1888.

Gladstone held the office of High Sheriff of Wiltshire in 1897, and was also a Justice of the Peace (JP) for Wiltshire. He was the Deputy Lieutenant of Wiltshire.

On his death aged 89 in 1945 Gladstone had three daughters, so the title passed to his cousin, Albert Charles Gladstone, who became the 5th Baronet.

References

External links
Gladstone on The Peerage.com website
Gladstone in the National Archives
Gladstone in the National Archives

Baronets in the Baronetage of the United Kingdom
1855 births
1945 deaths
People educated at Eton College
Alumni of Christ Church, Oxford
English justices of the peace
English people of Scottish descent
Deputy Lieutenants of Wiltshire
John Gladstone, 4th Baronet